, also known as KONI-TAN, is a Japanese actress, singer, songwriter, rapper, and record producer.

Career
Konishi appeared in Kiyoshi Kurosawa's 2006 film Retribution, which was screened at the 63rd Venice Film Festival. She also appeared in Hiroshi Ando's 2001 film Blue, Katsuhiro Otomo's 2004 film Steamboy, Junji Sakamoto's 2010 film Strangers in the City, and Shinji Aoyama's 2011 film Tokyo Park.

Filmography

Film
 Blue (2001)
 Kuroe (2001)
Letters from the Mountains (2002)
 Utsutsu (2002) 
 Bayside Shakedown 2 (2003)
 Steamboy (2004)
 Jam Films S (2005)
 All About My Dog (2005)
 Udon (2006) 
 The Angel's Egg (2006)
 Retribution (2007)
 Sweet Rain: Shinigami no Seido (2008)
 Nonchan Noriben (2009)
 Tomato no Shizuku (2010)
 Aibo II (2010)
 Surely Someday (2010)
 Saru Lock (2010)
 Strangers in the City (2010)
 Looking for a True Fiancee (2011)
 Tokyo Park (2011)
 Soup: Umarekawari no Monogatari (2012)
 Day and Night (2019)
 Majo no Kōsui (2023)

Television
 Drama D-mode Fukaku Mogure Hakkenden 2001 (2000)
 Sui10! Cocorico Miracle Type (2001)
 Shiroi Kage (2001)
 Shin Hoshi No Kinka (2001)
 Churasan (2001)
 Antique: Seiyo Kotto Yogashi Ten (2001)
 Hito ni Yasashiku (2002)
 Baberu (2002)
 Seikei Bijin (2002)
 Tentai Kansoku (2002)
 Churasan 2 (2003)
 Hotman (2003)
 Boku dake no Madonna (2003)
 Unmei ga Mieru Te (2003)
 Renai Shousetsu (2004)
 Fire Boys (2004)
 Hotman '04: Spring Special (2004)
 Churasan 3 (2004)
 Orange Days (2004)
 Ruri no Shima (2005)
 Water Boys 2005 Natsu (2005)
 Children (2006)
 Watashi no Atama no Naka no Keshigomu (2006)
 Akechi Mitsuhide: Kami ni Aisarenakatta Otoko (2007)
 Ruri no Shima: Special 2007 (2007)
 Kira Kira Kenshui (2007)
 Pandora (2008)
 Ashita no Kita Yoshio (2008)
 Ariadne no Dangan (2011)
 Stepfather Step (2012)
 Hanbun, Aoi (2018)
 Hiru (2022)

Bibliography
 Tegami (2004)
 27 (2006)

Discography
 "Sunny Day" (2008) (as Kazue Fujiki)
 "Here We Go" (2018)

Awards
 2002: Kinema Junpo Prize – New Actor
 2002: The 45th Blue Ribbon Awards – New Actor
 2003: The 26th Japan Academy Prize – New Actor
 2009: The 64th Mainichi Film Awards – Best Actress for Nonchan Noriben
 2009: The 31st Yokohama Film Festival – Best Actress for Nonchan Noriben

References

External links
 
 
 
 Official website of Kazue Fujiki

1978 births
Actors from Kagoshima Prefecture
Living people
Japanese actresses
Japanese rappers
Defstar Records artists
Musicians from Kagoshima Prefecture
21st-century Japanese singers
21st-century Japanese women singers